The Armed Forces of India are eligible for many military decorations awarded for extraordinary bravery and distinguished service during times of war and peace. Service and campaign medals have been awarded throughout India's history as an independent state.

Military medals

Decorations for precedence:

Wartime gallantry awards

Peacetime gallantry awards

Wartime distinguished service medals

Peacetime distinguished service medals

Distinguished service & gallantry medals

Service and campaign medals

Long service awards

Independence medals

Military reconnaissance and exploration medal

Mention in Dispatches 
Mention in Dispatches has been used since 1947, in order to recognize distinguished and meritorious service in operational areas and acts of gallantry which are not of a sufficiently high order to warrant the grant of gallantry awards.

Eligible personnel include all Army, Navy and Air Force personnel including personnel of the Reserve Forces, Territorial Army, Militia and other lawfully constituted Armed Forces, members of the Nursing Service and Civilians working under or with the Armed Forces.

Personnel can be mentioned in dispatches posthumously and multiple awards are also possible. A recipient of a Mention in a Despatch is entitled to wear an emblem, in the form of a lotus leaf on the ribbon of the relevant Campaign Medal. They are also issued with an official certificate from the Ministry of Defence.

Commendation Card

All three branches of the military issue Commendation Cards, which are badges awarded for "individual acts of gallantry or distinguished service or devotion to duty performed either in operation or non-operational areas. It is a type of gallantry award. The award will be for a specific act of bravery or distinguished service or special service. The award will not be made posthumously."

All three branches issue Commendations Cards at the level of the highest officer (Chief of the Army Staff, Chief of the Naval Staff and Chief of the Air Staff). The awards at lower levels seem to vary between services.

Order of wearing
The various decorations and medals are worn in the following order:

Note that the Police Medals, Fire Services Medals, Correctional Services Medals and Home Guards and Civil Defence Medals are excluded from the above list.
The above order of precedence of awards is as per the Indian Army. There are slight variations, especially in the campaign medals, in the order followed by the Indian Navy and the Indian Air Force.

Wearing medals by the next of kins

An order issued on 11 July 2019 by the Indian Army's "Ceremonial and Welfare Adjutant General's Branch" made it permissible for the close relatives of the deceased military personnel to wear their medals on the right side of chest while attending homage ceremonies at war memorials, cemeteries and funerals. These gallantry or service awards of deceased can be worn by their family members, such as spouses, children, parents, forefathers while wearing civil clothes.

See also
 Orders, decorations, and medals of India

References

External links

 Medals And Decorations of Indian Military
Official Website of the Indian Army, Awards Background
Indian Air Force :: Honours and Awards
Indian Navy Medals
Pride of India Medals and Honours

Military awards and decorations of India